Listed below are the dates and results for the 1998 FIFA World Cup qualification rounds for the Oceanian zone (OFC). For an overview of the qualification rounds, see the article 1998 FIFA World Cup qualification.

A total of 10 teams entered the competition. The Oceanian zone was allocated 0.5 places (out of 32) in the final tournament.

Format 
There would be three rounds of play:
First Round: Australia, New Zealand, Fiji and Tahiti, the four best ranked teams according to FIFA, received byes and advanced to the Second Round directly. The remaining 6 teams were divided into 2 groups of 3 teams each, namely the Melanesian Group and the Polynesian Group, based on geographical considerations. The teams played against each other once. The winner of the Melanesian Group would advance to the Second Round. The runner-up of the Melanesian Group and the winner of the Polynesian Group would advance to the First Round Play-off. In the Play-off, they played against each other on a home-and-away basis. The winner would advance to the Second Round.
Second Round: The 6 teams were divided into 2 groups of 3 teams each. The teams played against each other twice. The group winners would advance to the Final Round.
Final Round: The 2 teams played against each other on a home-and-away basis. The winner would advance to the AFC / OFC Intercontinental Play-off.

First round

Melanesian Group

Papua New Guinea advanced to the Second Round. Solomon Islands advanced to the First Round Play-off.

Polynesian Group

Tonga advanced to the First Round Play-off.

Play-off

Solomon Islands advanced to the Second Round by the aggregate score of 13–0.

Second round

Group 1

Australia advanced to the Final Round.

Group 2

New Zealand advanced to the Final Round.

Final round 

|}

Australia advanced to the AFC / OFC Intercontinental Play-off by the aggregate score of 5–0.

Inter-confederation play-off

Goalscorers
There were 88 goals scored in 24 matches (including 2 international play-offs), for an average of 3.67 goals per match.
7 goals

 Noel Berry

6 goals

 John Aloisi

5 goals

 Damian Mori
 Robert Seni

4 goals

 Aurelio Vidmar
 Vaughan Coveny
 Wynton Rufer

3 goals

 Graham Arnold
 Ernie Tapai
 Paul Trimboli

2 goals

 Craig Foster
 Harry Kewell
 Ned Zelic
 George Kiriau
 Augustine Peli
 Eddie Rukumana
 Timote Moleni 

1 goals

 Mark Bosnich
 Matthew Bingley
 Robbie Slater
 Mani Stenter
 Solome Pita
 Esala Masinisau
 Liuai Duguga
 Alivate Driu
 Chris Jackson
 Simon Elliott
 Tim Stevens
 Riki van Steeden
 Nik Viljoen
 Richard Daniel
 Batman Furigi
 Roy Karang
 Francis Niakuam
 Wesley Waiwai
 Michael Junior Palusami
 T. Tapunuu
 Jeffrey Kwaomae
 Batram Suri
 Moses Toata
 Danny Wabo
 Jean Ludivion
 Jean-Loup Rousseau
 Tolutau Vane
 Reginal Garo
 Iau Tuan Naukoot

1 own goal

 Jimmy Kaierea (playing against Australia)

External links
 1998 FIFA World Cup qualification (OFC) at FIFA.com

 
OFC
FIFA World Cup qualification (OFC)
qual